Turner is an unincorporated community in Columbia County, in the U.S. state of Washington.

History
Turner was platted in 1902 by B. M. Turner, and named for him. A post office called Turner was established in 1904, and remained in operation until 1934.

References

Unincorporated communities in Columbia County, Washington
Unincorporated communities in Washington (state)